Hirotoshi Masui (増井 浩俊, born June 25, 1984) is a Japanese professional baseball pitcher.

He selected .

Pitching style
Masui is a right-handed pitcher with an overhand delivery. As a reliever, he throws a four-seam fastball (tops out at 96 mph) and a forkball as his primary pitches.

References

External links

Career statistics - NPB.jp
 17 増井 浩俊 選手名鑑2021 - Orix Buffaloes  Official site 

1984 births
Living people
Hokkaido Nippon-Ham Fighters players
Japanese baseball players
Komazawa University alumni
Nippon Professional Baseball pitchers
Orix Buffaloes players
Baseball people from Shizuoka Prefecture
People from Yaizu, Shizuoka
2015 WBSC Premier12 players
2017 World Baseball Classic players